Per Johansson may refer to:

 Per Johansson (swimmer), Swedish swimmer
 Per Johansson (trade unionist), Swedish trade unionist
 Per Johansson (footballer born 1989), Swedish footballer
 Per Johansson (footballer born 1978), Swedish footballer
 Per Johansson (handballer), Swedish handballer
 Per Johansson (musician), Swedish saxophone player
 Pär Johansson, Swedish theatre chief